Arlene D. Brosas (born October 30, 1976) is a Filipina educator, child rights activist, and politician. She is a member of the Philippine House of Representatives for the 19th Congress and was part of the 18th Congress under the Gabriela Women’s Party-list group.

In Congress, she filed the anti-endo bill that sought to give workers security of tenure. She is also one of the co-authors of the Sexual Orientation and Gender Identity Expression (SOGIE) Equality Bill.

She was the spokesperson for the Anti-Child Pornography Alliance and spokesperson and co-convenor for the Save Nena campaign to stop child prostitution. She was also executive director of Akap sa Bata ng mga Guro Kalinga, a nationwide alliance of volunteer day-care teachers, and secretary general of the Akap Bata Party-list.

She was also a member of the 17th Congress where Gabriela received the second highest number of votes among party-list groups.

Early life and education 
Brosas comes from a poor family. She is third child in a brood of five. Her mother comes from a family of fishers and her father was a peasant.

She took up Philippine Studies at the University of the Philippines (U.P.) Diliman and went on to teach Philippine Literature, Humanities, and Science, Technology and Society at U.P. Baguio and U.P. Manila.

18th Congress 
Brosas was a member of the Philippine House of Representatives for the 18th Congress under the Gabriela Women’s Party-list group, during which she served as assistant minority leader.

Brosas is one of the co-authors of the SOGIE Equality Bill, which aims to prevent discrimination based on sexual orientation.

She is also co-author of the anti-endo bill that sought to give workers security of tenure by the ending the practice of endo or labor contractualization.

She also supports the franchise renewal for broadcast company ABS-CBN.

In 2020, Brosas joined fellow lawmakers in protesting the passage of House Bill number 6875, also known as the anti-terror bill.

In 2021, she opposed Resolution of Both Houses No. 2 that aims to amend economic provisions of the 1987 Constitution on foreign ownership of key industries.

Brosas supports climate justice and the protection of human rights.

19th Congress 

In 2022, Brosas was appointed as an assistant minority leader in the 19th Congress.

References 

1976 births
21st-century Filipino politicians
21st-century Filipino women politicians
Living people
Members of the House of Representatives of the Philippines for Gabriela Women's Party
Women members of the House of Representatives of the Philippines